Phalera flavescens is a nocturnal moth of the family Notodontidae. It is found in Taiwan, China, Japan and Korea.

The wingspan is 45–54 for males and 55–59 mm for females.

Ecology
They have been known to be eaten by Formica japonica, a species of diurnal ant.

References

External links
Images
Japanese moths

Notodontidae
Moths of Asia
Moths of Japan
Moths of Korea
Moths of Taiwan
Moths described in 1852